Captain Donald Clive Anderson (18 April 1897 – 2 January 1957) was an English military consultant and historian. He joined the British Indian Army before fighting in the Mesopotamia and Palestine in World War I. Anderson toured Australia before working in Sudan on The Four Feathers film in 1939, working for the Ministry of Information during World War II, and following the war working on Festival of Britain.

Early life
Donald Anderson was born in Cookham, England. He probably attended the Quetta cadet college. He was commissioned on to the Unattached List, British Indian Army on 15 November 1915, was admitted to the British Indian Army on 18 November and was attached to 122nd Rajputana Infantry. The regiment was stationed in India at Kohat until late 1916, entraining on 1 November 1916, embarking on 3 November 1916 and landing at Basra, Mesopotamia, on 8 November 1916. He was promoted Lieutenant on 15 November 1916. In early 1918 a company was detached from the regiment and sent to Palestine to form part of a new unit, the 2nd battalion, 154th Indian Infantry. On 31 May 1918 he was posted to 2nd battalion, 154th Indian Infantry as well, being made Adjutant on 9 June 1918. The regiment formed part of 233rd Brigade, 75th Division and fought in Palestine. He held the rank of acting Captain commanding a company from 28 May 1917 to 24 September 1917, 24 September 1917 to 20 November 1917 and 17 February 1918 to 14 November 1918.

He remained in the British Indian Army after the war, being promoted Captain on 15 November 1919 but retired on 15 March 1923 under the terms of the Royal Warrant of 25 April 1923, owing to the reduction of the Indian Army.

After the war Anderson returned to Britain, visiting family in Guernsey in 1920.

An early skier, Anderson spent the winter of 1920–21 in Switzerland in Mürren, the town where the famous Kandahar ski club was set up in 1924. The name for the club is said to be named after the "Roberts of Kandahar-Cup" first run in 1911. During the 1880 Afghanistan War Lord Roberts won a battle in Kandahar.

In early 1921 Anderson sailed to Australia on the P&O ship SS Macedonia and returned to England in the early 1930s.

While in Australia, Anderson visited Il Parran, Glenn Innes (1923), Hobart (August 1924), visiting Amy Gant, Anderson's mother's first cousin wife of Tetley Gant, member of the Tasmanian Legislative Council.

In 1924 with C. L. Morell, Anderson toured several stations in the Northern Territory and Queensland – Barclay Downs, Lawn Hill Station, Alexandra – before returning through Goondiwindi and Pukawidgi near Inverell in 1925.

Career

Anderson was the military consultant<ref>[http://www.soldiersofthequeen.com/HollywoodRaj-WilliamQuinnellandTheFourFeathers1939.html Drummer William A. P. Quinnell and the filming of 'The Four Feathers, 1939]. Screen Actors in the Role of Her Majesty's Soldiers, "The Hollywood Raj".</ref> for the 1939 film The Four Feathers directed by Zoltan Korda, starring John Clements, Ralph Richardson, June Duprez and C. Aubrey Smith. Captain Anderson ensured the accuracy of the military uniforms and procedure in England and Sudan. During filming, Captain Anderson dressed as a Sudanese tribesman and led the charge of Khalifa's cavalry during filming.

During World War II, Anderson worked for the Ministry of Information using experience gained in the making of the Four Feathers. He was also the Australian specialist for the Ministry because of his time spent in Australia.

After the war Anderson worked as Chief Press Officer for the Festival of Britain in London, 1951.

Shakespeare
In the 1930s Anderson researched the idea that William Shakespeare may have been written by Edward de Vere, 17th Earl of Oxford and was a friend of John Thomas Looney

Published workJournal of the Society for Army Historical Research, Spring 1953. Vol. XXXI. No. 125.
McGuffie, T. H., ed. (L. E. Buckell, Major G. Tylden, Major P. Young, W. Y. Carman, Dr. F. Herrmann, C. C. P. Lawson, Major J. H. Busby, C. T. Atkinson, S. H. Ward, Major N. P. Dawnay, G. O. Rickword, Captain D. C. Anderson, Captain R. A. Ingham Clark, et al.). Published by Society for Army Historical Research, London, 1953.

Family
The son of Frank Anderson, Donald had one brother Patrick and two sisters, Blanche and Christine. Patrick died in an aeroplane crash while in the Royal Flying Corps on 19 October 1917, aged 18; he was based at Waddington, Turnhouse and Midlothian.

Anderson married English author Verily Bruce in 1940. They had five children: Marian, Rachel, Edward, Janie, and Alexandra.

Anderson is buried at St. Laurence Churchyard, Catsfield, Rother District, East Sussex, England.

 References

 The London Gazette 26 March 1918
 Indian Army List January 1919
 Quarterly Army List March 1922
 Commonwealth War Graves Commission

External links
 "Navy, Army, and Air Force Institutes in War and Peace" by Captain Donald Anderson, late 6th Rajputana Rifles. Royal United Services Institution Journal, Volume 85, Issue 537, 1940.
 "Naval Canteen Launches", by Captain Donald Anderson, late 6th Rajputana Rifles. Royal United Services Institution Journal'', Volume 85, Issue 538, 1940.
 The 122nd Rajputana Infantry in Mesopotamia 1917-1918, Christopher Trevelyan, King-Emperor

1897 births
1957 deaths
Indian Army personnel of World War I
People from Cookham
British Indian Army officers